Urbano Navarrete Cortés, S.J. (25 May 1920 – 22 November 2010) was a Spanish Roman Catholic cardinal, professor of canon law and former rector of the Pontifical Gregorian University. He was made a cardinal in 2007 by Pope Benedict XVI.

Biography
Cardinal Navarrete Cortés was born in Camarena de la Sierra, Teruel; his father was José Navarrete Esteban. He entered the Society of Jesus on 20 June 1937; after his licentiate in philosophy and in theology he obtained a doctorate in canon law. Cardinal Navarrete was ordained to the priesthood on 31 May 1952, during the International Eucharistic Congress. A world-renowned canonist, he then served as Dean of the Faculty of Canon Law at the Pontifical Gregorian University in Rome until 1980, when he was appointed rector. Navarrete was granted an honorary doctorate by the Pontifical University of Salamanca in 1994 and was a consultor to the Congregation for Divine Worship and the Discipline of the Sacraments in the Roman Curia.

On 17 October 2007, Pope Benedict XVI announced that he would elevate Navarrete to the College of Cardinals. The Pope honored Navarrete's request to be dispensed from the requirement of episcopal consecration, and, at the consistory in St. Peter's Basilica on 24 November 2007, Navarrete was created Cardinal Deacon of S. Ponziano. His appointment followed the precedent set by previous Popes for rewarding priests who have made significant contributions to the life and work of the Church.

Navarrete Cortés died on 22 November 2010.

References

External links
Cardinals of the Holy Roman Church
Catholic-Hierarchy
Catholic-pages

1920 births
2010 deaths
21st-century Spanish cardinals
20th-century Spanish Jesuits
Canon law jurists
Cardinals created by Pope Benedict XVI
Jesuit cardinals
People from the Province of Teruel
Academic staff of the Pontifical Gregorian University